Batrachorhina miredoxa is a species of beetle in the family Cerambycidae. It was described by Pierre Téocchi in 1986. It is known from Cameroon.

References

Endemic fauna of Cameroon
Batrachorhina
Beetles described in 1986